Rainhill Hospital was a very large psychiatric hospital complex that was located in Rainhill, formerly Lancashire but now Merseyside, England.

History
The facility was designed by Harvey Lonsdale Elmes and opened as the Third Lancashire County Lunatic Asylum on 1 January 1851. Additional wings designed by Henry Horner were completed in 1860. It became the County Lunatic Asylum, Rainhill in 1861.

In 1877 a new annexe was designed by George Enoch Grayson and Edward Ould and constructed to the north-west of Rainhill Road. The annexe would later become known as the Avon Division. The Avon Division was designed to facilitate the accommodation of long-term, chronically mentally ill patients who were breaching capacity on what became known as the Sherdley Division which was subsequently mainly used for acute cases. The Avon Division was noted for its distinctive water towers and linear design. Some new buildings designed in a Tudor Revival style were added to the Avon Division in around 1900.

The hospital was the location of the Great Porridge Strike on 6 April 1913 when the staff, members of the National Asylum Workers' Union, went on strike in protest when meat was replaced by oatmeal porridge. The facility became the County Mental Hospital, Rainhill in 1923 and at the peak of its activity, in the 1930s, there were approximately 3,000 inpatients resident at the hospital.

From 1938 to 1949 the admissions part of the hospital served as a Royal Naval Auxiliary Hospital. From 1943 to 1944 the Medical Officer in Charge was Surgeon Captain Joseph Roland Brennan RN.

The hospital joined the National Health Service as Rainhill Mental Hospital in 1948. Following the introduction of Care in the Community in the early 1980s, services transferred to Aintree Hospital and Whiston Hospital; the Avon Division closed in 1987 and the Sherdley Division closed in June 1992. The Scott Clinic, a medium secure facility, moved to new facilities on the Sherdley Division site. The facility was demolished in late 1992.

The site was initially acquired by Pilkington Glass for development of a new headquarters but instead Pilkington decided to sell off the site for residential use. The site has been developed and is now known as Reeve Court.

See also
Scott Clinic, a medium secure psychiatric unit and the only mental health facility to remain on the former Rainhill Hospital site
Care in the Community, 1980's British government policy of deinstitutionalisation
Lancaster Moor Hospital, the first Lancashire County Asylum
Prestwich Hospital, the second Lancashire County Asylum
Whittingham Hospital, the fourth Lancashire County Asylum
Winwick Hospital, the fifth Lancashire County Asylum
Calderstones Hospital, the sixth Lancashire County Asylum
Knowsley Resource and Recovery Centre, Whiston Hospital, a low secure psychiatric unit that was established following the closure of the Sherdley Division at Rainhill. The recovery centre was opened in 1990 as the Sherdley Unit, its namesake being an homage to its predecessor.
The Windsor Clinic, Aintree Hospital, an acute alcohol detoxification unit that was transferred to Aintree following the closure of Rainhill Hospital.

References

External links
 Lancashire County Asylum

Hospital buildings completed in 1851
Buildings and structures demolished in 1992
Defunct hospitals in England
Former psychiatric hospitals in England
Hospitals in Merseyside
Buildings and structures in the Metropolitan Borough of St Helens
1851 establishments in England
Demolished buildings and structures in England